The 2006–07 Ligat Nashim was the ninth season of women's league football under the Israeli Football Association.

The league was won by Maccabi Holon, its fourth consecutive title. By winning, Maccabi Holon qualified to 2007–08 UEFA Women's Cup. The second division was won by Ironi Bat Yam.

Ligat Nashim Rishona

League table

Top scorers

Ligat Nashim Shniya

League table

References

External links
Ligat Nashim Rishona @ Israeli Football Association
Ligat Nashim Shniya @ Israeli Football Association

Ligat Nashim seasons
1
women
Israel